Ryan Luis Horacio Oduber (August 16, 1997) is an Arubian professional baseball baseball pitcher for the Hoofddorp Pioniers of the Honkbal Hoofdklasse. Oduber was named to the Netherlands national baseball team for the 2017 World Baseball Classic

Oduber spent time in the Boston Red Sox organization from 2014 until his release in early 2018.

References

External links

1997 births
Living people
People from Oranjestad, Aruba
Dutch expatriate baseball players in the United States
Dominican Summer League Red Sox players
Aruban expatriate baseball players in the Dominican Republic
Gulf Coast Red Sox players
2017 World Baseball Classic players
Aruban expatriate baseball players in the United States
Lowell Spinners players